A list of notable electronic design automation (EDA) companies.

Existing companies

Software companies

FPGA companies

Electronics distribution companies

Development communities

Defunct companies

See also
 List of items in the category Electronic Design Automation companies
 Comparison of EDA software
 Cadence Design Systems: Acquisitions and mergers
 Synopsys: Acquisitions, mergers, spinoffs

References

Lists of technology companies